Charles Fleetford Sise Sr. (27 September 1834 – 9 April 1918) was an American-born Canadian businessman and one of the first presidents of Bell Canada.  He was also part of its first board of directors, and that of the Northern Electric and Manufacturing Company (later known as Nortel), the telephone company's equipment manufacturer, from 1895 to 1918.

He had formerly been a "hard nosed" sea captain before being commissioned as an agent by the newly formed National Bell Telephone Company of Boston, Massachusetts, to help lead its incipient Canadian division.

From the time he was hired as an agent to Bell Canada in 1880 until his death in 1918 he was the company's single greatest advocate and leader, also overseeing its necessary divestiture of territories in the Maritime Provinces in 1887–89 and from the Prairie Provinces during 1908–09.  His moulding influence and direction during those many years was extensive, pivotal and decisive, with his influence ultimately enduring until the last of his proteges retired in 1944.

Biography 

Sise was born on  27 September 1834 in Portsmouth, New Hampshire as the sixth son of Edward Fleetford Sise and Ann Mary Simes. His father owned shares in ships and was also a merchant. Sise had two wives, first marrying Clara Bunker in Mobile Alabama on 20 February 1860, with whom he had four daughters, and then marrying Caroline Johnson Pettingell in Newburyport, Massachusetts on 4 June 1873, with whom he had three sons.

He received his education only to age 16 at which time he was hired on to one of the ships owned by his family. He subsequently received his commission as a ship's captain, again on a family owned merchant ship, the Annie Sise, six years later.  He commanded ships across the Atlantic and Pacific oceans for several years until his first marriage in 1860, when he entered into the ship-brokering business in New Orleans.

Born and raised as a 'northerner', Sise was closer to the sympathies of the Southern Confederacy during the American Civil War, and reportedly helped their efforts, likely due to his friendship with the Confederacy's president, Jefferson Davis.  Sise served as a blockade runner and intelligence agent for the Confederated States, and was also Davis' personal secretary, leading to a several years long estrangement with his family in Portsmouth .

After starting his own shipping and merchandizing business in Liverpool, England in 1864 which he maintained for several years, he returned to his family's shipping business to skipper their Annie Sise on a commercial  voyage to Australia in 1867. After his return to the United States he left the maritime shipping business and started off anew in the insurance industry as the U.S. representative for the Royal Canadian Insurance Company of Montreal, where he was to meet the future president of the Bell Telephone Company of Canada.

In March 1880  he was engaged as a corporate agent by William H. Forbes, president of the National Bell Telephone of Boston, and sent to Montreal to lead Bell's consolidation of the telephone industry in Canada, a task he vigorously pursued over the remainder of his life. That included the company's fight against Western Union and the acquisition of several telephone and telegraph companies operating in Canada, acquiring over  3,000 existing telephones in the process.

Sise spent the remainder of this life battling for the Canadian telephone company he helped create. Biographer Robert E. Babe wrote of his character:

In 1880 Sise had been hired by Forbes as a special agent for Bell Canada and its associated Canadian Telephone Company (its holding company). He then served as its vice-president and managing director from 1880 to 1890, and then as its president and general director from 1890 until 1915. In 1915 he was promoted to chairman of the board, a position he held until his death in 1918.  During his years he was the company's single greatest advocate and leader, also overseeing its necessary divestiture of territories in the Maritime Provinces  in 1887–89 and from the Prairie Provinces during 1908–09.  His influence and direction during those many years was extensive, pivotal and decisive, and also included the installation of key associates (including his sons) to senior positions within Bell and its allied Northern Electric, his influence ultimately enduring until the last of them retired in 1944.

Sise died on 9 April 1918 in Montreal.  The Charles Fleetford Sise Chapter of the Telephone Pioneers of America was subsequently named after him.

Family involvement in telecommunications 

His sons were also involved in Bell Canada and its equipment manufacturing division, Northern Electric (later to be renamed Nortel):

 Charles Fleetford Sise Jr. headed Bell Canada from 1925 to 1944.
 Edward Fleetford Sise President of Northern Electric 1914-1919
 Paul Fleetford Sise President of Northern Electric 1919-1948

See also 

 Thomas Wardrope Eadie

References

 Citations 

 Bibliography

Further reading 

 Fetherstonhaugh, R.C. Charles Fleetford Sise: 1834-1918, 1944.

1834 births
1918 deaths
Canadian businesspeople
People from Portsmouth, New Hampshire
Nortel
Businesspeople in manufacturing
American emigrants to Canada